The following lists events that happened during 1904 in South Africa.

Incumbents
 Governor of the Cape of Good Hope and High Commissioner for Southern Africa:Walter Hely-Hutchinson.
 Governor of the Colony of Natal: Henry Edward McCallum.
 Prime Minister of the Cape of Good Hope: John Gordon Sprigg (until 22 February), Leander Starr Jameson (starting 22 February).
 Prime Minister of the Orange River Colony: Alfred Milner.
 Prime Minister of the Colony of Natal: George Morris Sutton.

Events

February
 Pneumonic plague breaks out in Johannesburg.

June
 22 – The first of 62,000 Chinese labourers arrive in South Africa to relieve the shortage of unskilled mine workers.

Unknown date
 Der shtral, a Yiddish-language newspaper is founded.
 The Social Democratic Federation (SDF) is established in Cape Town.

Births
 16 February – Philip Rabinowitz, South African record-breaking sprinter (d. 2008)

Deaths
 3 June – Vincent Tancred, South African cricketer (b. 1875)
 14 July – Paul Kruger, exiled president of the South African Republic, dies in Clarens, Switzerland, at the age of 78.
 1 November – Willem Eduard Bok, politician (b. 1846)

Railways

Railway lines opened
 1 February – Cape Western – Maitland to Ottery, .
 1 March – Cape Midland – Le Roux to Oudtshoorn, .
 7 June – Cape Western – Paarl to Franschhoek, .
 15 June – Free State – Thaba 'Nchu to Modderpoort, .
 17 August – Cape Eastern – Indwe to Xalanga, .
 1 September – Free State – Hamilton to Tempe, .
 7 September – Cape Eastern – Amabele to Komga, .
 17 October – Cape Eastern – Middledrift to Adelaide, .
 3 November – Natal – Pietermaritzburg to Elandskop, .
 December – Cape Western – Artois to Ceres Road, .
 15 December – Transvaal – Langlaagte to Vereeniging, .

Locomotives
Cape
 Four new Cape gauge locomotive types enter service on the Cape Government Railways (CGR):
 Two experimental superheated 6th Class 4-6-0 locomotives. In 1912 they will be designated  by the South African Railways (SAR).
 Four Karoo Class  Pacific passenger steam locomotives. In 1912 they will be designated  by the SAR. 
 The last eight 8th Class 2-8-0 Consolidation type locomotives. In 1912 they will be designated Class 8Z on the SAR.
 The final batch of ten 8th Class  Mastodon type locomotives. In 1912 they will be designated Class 8F on the SAR.
 Six "Type B" 4-6-0 steam locomotives enter service on the Avontuur narrow gauge line in the Langkloof.
 A single 0-4-2 inverted saddle-tank locomotive named Caledonia is placed in service by the Cape Copper Company as a shunting engine at O'okiep in the Cape Colony.

Natal
 Two new Cape gauge locomotive types enter service on the Natal Government Railways (NGR):
 Twenty-five Class E  Mountain type tank locomotives. In 1912 they will become the Class G on the SAR.
 Fifty Class B  Mastodon type mainline steam locomotives. In 1912 they will be designated  on the SAR. 
 The Natal Harbours Department places a single  saddle-tank locomotive named Sir Albert in service as dock shunter in Durban Harbour.

Transvaal
 Five new Cape gauge locomotive types enter service on the Central South African Railways (CSAR):
 Five Class 9  Pacific type locomotives.
 Fifteen Class 10  Pacific passenger locomotives.
 Thirty-six Class 11  Mikado type locomotives.
 Eight Class F  Baltic type tank locomotives in suburban service between Springs and Randfontein.
 A single experimental  Class M Kitson-Meyer type articulated steam locomotive.
 The CSAR rebuilds most of its Reid Tenwheeler  tank locomotives to  tank-and-tender locomotives. In 1912 these converted locomotives will be designated Class 13 on the SAR.

References

 
South Africa
Years in South Africa